Nebria fongondi is a species of ground beetle in the Nebriinae subfamily that is endemic to Pakistan.

References

fongondi
Beetles described in 1981
Beetles of Asia
Endemic fauna of Pakistan